Jessica Doreen Degenhardt (born April 21, 2002 in Dresden) is a German luger. She is four-time Junior World Champion and won gold medal at the 2020 Winter Youth Olympics at doubles' race and silver medal at the individual race.  She also retains the World Championships gold medal at 2022, 2023 in women's doubles discipline and Women's doubles' sprint discipline in 2023.

Career
Degenhardt started her luge career at PSV Elbe Dresden in 2010 when she was eight years old. Currently, she is a member of the RRC Altenberg club and German national team.

Youth and Junior career
Degenhardt kicked off her first season in the youth field (Youth B) in 2015/16. After successful season at Youth B division, she moved up to youth A division in the 2016/17 season. In this season, she finished the German championship in Winterberg as runner-up. She also secured the multiple victories in the Youth A World Cup including the Oberhof, Altenberg and Winterberg races and won the overall ranking of the World Cup.

In the 2017/18 season, she also competed in the Youth A division. At the German A-Youth Championships on her home track in Altenberg, she won the title and moved up to Junior division. At the 2018 Junior World Championships on her home track, she achieved bronze behind Jessica Tiebel and the Russian Tatjana Zwetowa.

In 2018/19 season, Degenhardt started to competed in the Junior  World Cup. In Oberhof, she won her first race in the Junior World Cup and also won the relay race with the German team. She finished second in Winterberg and third in Calgary. In the overall standings, she was only beaten by the Russian Zwetowa by 15 points with 402 points. She also competed with Vanessa Schneider in the girls' doubles race, which was held for the first time this season. In their first race together in St. Moritz, they took silver behind their teammates Anka Jänicke and Saskia Schirmer. The end of the season, Degenhardt/Schneider won the two remaining races of the season in Winterberg and Oberhof and ended up second in the overall standings behind Caitlin Nash and Natalie Corless. At the Junior World Championships 2019 in Igls, Degenhardt concluded the competition with third place behind Cheyenne Rosenthal and Verena Hofer.

In the 2019/20 season, she started with two wins in Igls, with Schneider in doubles and in singles. She also secured second place in the second individual race in Igls behind Kailey Allan from Canada. Degenhardt/Schneider won the overall World Cup for juniors with five victories in six races and 500 points. At the 2020 Winter Youth Olympics, she was the German flag bearer in the opening ceremony. In Winter Youth Olympics individual race, she defeated to her teammate Merle Fräbel. However, one day later she won the first ever Olympic gold medal in the women's doubles with Schneider.  In mid-February, Degenhardt won the gold medal at the 2020 Junior World Luge Championships in Oberhof in the individual ahead of the Russian Diana Loginowa and the Austrian Lisa Schulte, as well as together with Moritz Bollmann and the doubles Max Ewald and Jakob Jannusch in the team relay race.
The 2020/21 junior season was canceled due to the COVID-19 pandemic, so Degenhardt was unable to start a race.

Senior career
After Jessica Tiebel withdrew from the ongoing competitions of the 2019/20 season, Degenhardt moved up to the World Cup team for the last race of the season at Königssee after her outstanding performances in the youth and junior divisions in the season. In her first ever World Cup race, she completed with eleventh place, missing out on the top ten by just one place and 0.02 seconds compared to Sandra Robatscher. In the overall world cup ranking, she reached 43rd place with 34 points, tied with the Pole Natalia Jamróz.

At the inaugural doubles world championships in 2022 in Winterberg, Degenhardt won the title with her doubles partner Cheyenne Rosenthal.

Luge results
All results are sourced from the International Luge Federation (FIL) and German Bobsleigh, Luge and Skeleton Federation (BSD).

World Championships
 3 medal (3 gold)

World Cup

Singles

Doubles

References

External links

Jessica Degenhardt at the German Bobsleigh, Luge and Skeleton Federation

Living people
2002 births
German female lugers
Sportspeople from Dresden